Greig Lake is a lake on Vancouver Island west of Buttle Lake in Strathcona Provincial Park.

See also
List of lakes of British Columbia

References

Alberni Valley
Lakes of Vancouver Island
Strathcona Provincial Park
Nootka Land District